Kara Miller is the creator of The Lifestylista. She is a writer and director working in film and television. She is also credited as K. J. Miller.

Biography
Kara Miller was born in Jamaica. High school: Harrison College, Barbados and United World College of the Atlantic, UK.  University: Somerville College, Oxford.

Miller's directing credits include: Nobody The Great (Winner of Cinequest Film Festival's Viewers' Voice Audience Award for "Best Feature Film"); award-winning short films (Cheese Makes You Dream, Elephant Palm Tree and How to Make Friends) have been aired on HBO and the BBC and have screened at film festivals such as Sundance Film Festival, Berlin Film Festival and London Film Festival.

She was on the board of directors of the British Academy of Film and Television Arts BAFTA, Los Angeles.

Miller's writing credits include Boo! (BBC) and Jim Jam & Sunny (ITV). She also has numerous writing credits in theatre and BBC Radio 4 – Letting Yourself Go (White Open Spaces) was nominated for a South Bank Show Award.

Winner of a Breakthrough Brit Award and the Hitchcock Award, the Screen Nation "Best Emerging Talent" award and was shortlisted for the BBC's New Filmmaker Award.

References

External links 

Kara Miller, "My time as a Breakthrough Brit", Wednesday, 2 July 2008, BBC Entertainment News
The Lifestylista
The Lifestylista on Facebook
 The BAFTA Los Angeles Board

British television personalities
British television writers
British television producers
British women television producers
Jamaican film directors
Jamaican women writers
Jamaican women film directors
People educated at Atlantic College
People educated at Harrison College (Barbados)
Alumni of Somerville College, Oxford
Living people
Year of birth missing (living people)
British women television writers